Anna Bond is a 2012 Kannada-language romantic action film written and directed by Duniya Soori.  Produced by Parvathamma Rajkumar, it stars Puneeth Rajkumar, Nidhi Subbaiah and Priyamani and Jackie Shroff in a negative role. The movie was released on 1 May 2012. V. Harikrishna was the music director for the film. The film follows Bond Ravi, a karate champ, as he valiantly searches for Charlie, a precarious rival, with his sidekick, Chapathi Babu, so as to rescue his ladylove Meera.

Anna Bond opened to mixed reviews praising the cast performances action sequences, cinematography, music and background score but criticize the writing, humor and lack of strong antagonist. It was mentioned on "The Most Disappointing Kannada Films of 2012" list by Rediff, and got a thumbs down from critics.

Plot
Bond Ravi aka Ravi is a generous youngster, who has the tendency of helping others. He is a  kung-fu champion and also works as a Reflexologist of Shingapoore, Karnataka. He meets Meera on a bus and falls in love with her. One day, Ravi meets Meera, who seeks Ravi's help to make a documentary film. She stays with her sister Divya. When Meera is about to leave the village, She tells him to achieve something big in life. Ravi, along with Chapathi Babu, leaves his village. On the way, he meets a military personnel, who is ordered to tend the wounds of an army Major named Chandrakanth. A sudden shoot begins from a crime boss and terrorist named Charlie. Bond Ravi helps Chandrakanth by knocking Charlie when he tried to kill Chandrakanth.

Ravi and Meera (who is revealed to be Chandrakanth's daughter) grow closer and they begin a relationship. Meanwhile, Charlie is in lookout for his daughter who thinks that his daughter is with Chandrakanth. Charlie, while hunting for his daughter, kills Divya (assuming her to be Chandrakanth's daughter) where Chandrakanth reveals that Divya is actually Charlie's daughter. Enraged, Charlie kidnaps Meera. Ravi tries to locate Charlie by interrogating the subordinates by donning the name Anna Bond where he finds Charlie's hideout and engages in a cage fight with Charlie's henchman and defeats them. Ravi and Charlie play a game of death where Ravi kills Charlie, destroys the hideout and reunites with Meera where he continues his duties as Anna Bond.

Cast
 Puneeth Rajkumar as Bond Ravi alias Anna Bond
 Nidhi Subbaiah as Divya
 Priyamani as Meera 
 Jackie Shroff as Charlie
 Rangayana Raghu as Chapathi Babu
 Avinash as Major Chandrakanth
 Balu Nagendra as Bala
Petrol Prasanna as Prasanna 
 Chi. Guru Dutt as David 
 John Kokken as John Mathew
 Sathish Ninasam as Surya Honalkere, Film Director
 Achyuth Kumar
 V. Manohar as Singapore Chandrappa 
 Honnavalli Krishna 
Apoorva 
Shashikala 
Vidya murthy 
Jayashree raj 
Varsha krishnan 
Yamuna Murthy 
B. K. Shivaram 
Rajashekhar kadamba 
Tumkur Mohan 
Prashanth Siddi 
Raj Kumar 
Rockline Sudhakar

Production

Development
Anna Bond is the second Puneeth Rajkumar movie with Duniya Soori after the acclaimed and highly successful 2010 film Jackie. The film was officially launched on 7 October 2011, a day after the release of Puneet's film Paramathma, and filming commenced on 10 October. Being a big budget film, it is said to have a story with a revolutionary concept, but with the entertainment quotient intact and a lot of graphics to support its narration.

It is the 80th film of Kannada thespian Dr. Rajkumar's production unit, Poornima Enterprises. The technical team was the same one that worked for Jackie, including V. Harikrishna for music, Shashidhar Adapa for art, Sathya Hegde for cinematography and Imran Sardhariya for choreography. There were five songs, with lyrics penned by Yogaraj Bhat, Jayanth Kaikini and Kaviraj.

Filming
The film was shot in Bangalore, Coorg and Kanakapura. The film unit also shot two songs in Spain among the fanfare of locals to watch the song and dance.

Soundtrack
The Music was Composed by V. Harikrishna and Released by Anand Audio Video.

Critical Reception  
The film received generally mixed reviews from critics. A critic from The Times of India scored the film at 3.5 out of 5 stars and says "Puneet, who looks smart and has delivered an amazing performance. Priyamani, too, impresses with her expressions and dialogue delivery. Nidhi Subbaiah is lively. Jackie Shroff is the right choice for Charlie's role. Rangayana Raghu's comic track has clicked. Music by V Harikrishna has some excellent catchy tunes to the lyrics of Yograj Bhat, Jayant Kaikini and Chi. Udayashankar". Srikanth Srinivasa from Rediff.com scored the film at 2.5 out of 5 stars and wrote "Cinematographer Satya Hegde's frames are superb and tight. His camera work sets the tone for the film although he doesn't get much support from the story. But director Suri has not come out of his Jackie fixation. Stay clear of this film if you are not a Puneeth fan!". Shruti I. L from DNA wrote "Full marks to Imran Sardaria for innovative choreography. Music director Harikrishna also delivers. Kaanadante Mayava-denu... sung by Puneet and Boni agada… are the most entertaining of the lot.  Watch Anna Bond if you are a Puneet fan! Period". B S Srivani from Deccan Herald wrote "There’s still a possibility of Appu turning “desi” Bond, like his illustrious father – under Soori’s direction, romancing and fighting across pristine locales of Karnataka. Any takers?". A critic from Bangalore Mirror wrote  "The saving grace is the music by Harikrishna and lyrics by Bhat and Jayant Kaikini. However, the picturisation does not live up to the expectations. Even the remix of Chi Udayashankar’s classic Kaanadante Maayavadenu loses its innocence, though Puneeth sings it again after 30 years". A critic from The Hindu wrote "Puneet leads the way and Rangayana Raghu and Ninasam Satish are brilliant. Jackie Shroff is a huge letdown and his Kannada is intolerable. As Nidhi Subbaiah's character is as slim as her physique, it is not fair to expect anything from her. Priyamani is good to some extent". A critic from The New Indian Express wrote "Soori has managed to balance comedy and love with good screenplay in the first half of ‘Anna Bond’. But, he could not hold the grip in the second half. Director has concentrated more on the technical aspects of the film".

Accolades

References

External links
 

2012 films
2010s Kannada-language films
Indian action thriller films
Indian romantic thriller films
Indian romantic action films
2012 action thriller films
2010s romantic thriller films
2012 action comedy films
Films shot in Spain
Films scored by V. Harikrishna
2012 masala films
Indian films about revenge
Indian action comedy films
Films set in Karnataka
Films shot in Karnataka
Films directed by Duniya Soori
2012 comedy films